Itwa is a constituency of the Uttar Pradesh Legislative Assembly covering the city of Itwa in the Siddharth Nagar district of Uttar Pradesh, India.

Itwa is one of five assembly constituencies in the Domariyaganj Lok Sabha constituency. Since 2008, this assembly constituency is numbered 305 amongst 403 constituencies.

Members of Legislative Assembly
Mata Prasad Pandey won Itwa constituency for the six consecutive terms from Samajwadi Party, Janata Dal, Janata Party (Secular) and Lok Dal.

Election results

2022

2017

Bharatiya Janta Party candidate Dr. Satish Chandra Dwivedi won in last Assembly election of 2017 Uttar Pradesh Legislative Elections defeating Bahujan Samaj Party candidate Arshad Khursheed by a margin of 10,208 votes.

2012

2007

1996

See also
 Itwa
 List of constituencies of Uttar Pradesh Legislative Assembly
 Siddharthnagar district

References

External links
 

Assembly constituencies of Uttar Pradesh
Siddharthnagar district